Illya Fedorovych Mate (spelled Maté, born 6 October 1956) is a retired Soviet Ukrainian freestyle wrestler. He won gold medals at the 1980 Olympics and 1979 and 1982 world championships, finishing third in 1981. Mate was reputed for his deceitfully flabby appearance, which misled his opponents into thinking of him as of an "easy prey," as well as for his springy sudden movements and the mat generalship, avoiding flukes, and providing no "chinks in the armor" for his opponents.

Biography

Early years
Mate was born to a Greek father and Ukrainian mother. He began training in kuresh wrestling while studying in a secondary school.

Prime years

He took up freestyle wrestling in 1970 and won the Soviet heavyweight title in 1978–80 and 1982.

Retirement and later years
After retiring from competitions he worked as a private entrepreneur in Donetsk, and remained involved with the Donetsk Wrestling Federation. Since 2003, an annual junior freestyle wrestling tournament has been held in Donetsk Oblast in his honor.

International competition record

|-
! style=background:white colspan=7 |International competition record (incomplete)
|-
!  Res.
!  Opponent
!  Score
!  Time
!  Date
!  Event
!  Location
|-
! style=background:white colspan=7 |
|-
|Win
|align=left| Július Strnisko
|style="font-size:88%"|15–3
|style="font-size:88%"|
|style="font-size:88%"|1980-07
|rowspan=6 style="text-align:center; font-size:88%"|1980 Summer Olympics
|rowspan=6 style="text-align:center; font-size:88%"| Moscow
|-
|Win
|align=left| Tomasz Busse
|style="font-size:88%"|9–2
|style="font-size:88%"|
|style="font-size:88%"|1980-07
|-
|Win
|align=left| Slavcho Chervenkov
|style="font-size:88%"|6–4
|style="font-size:88%"|
|style="font-size:88%"|1980-07
|-
|Win
|align=left| Antal Bodó
|style="font-size:88%"|Tech Fall
|style="font-size:88%"|1:41
|style="font-size:88%"|1980-07
|-
|Win
|align=left| Bárbaro Morgan
|style="font-size:88%"|Passivity
|style="font-size:88%"|7:02
|style="font-size:88%"|1980-07
|-
|Win
|align=left| Santiago Morales
|style="font-size:88%"|Tech Fall
|style="font-size:88%"|3:42
|style="font-size:88%"|1980-07

References

External links

1956 births
Living people
Soviet male sport wrestlers
Soviet people of Greek descent
Ukrainian people of Greek descent
Olympic wrestlers of the Soviet Union
Wrestlers at the 1980 Summer Olympics
Ukrainian male sport wrestlers
Olympic gold medalists for the Soviet Union
Olympic medalists in wrestling
Medalists at the 1980 Summer Olympics
Universiade medalists in wrestling
World Wrestling Championships medalists
Universiade gold medalists for the Soviet Union
Medalists at the 1981 Summer Universiade
Sportspeople from Donetsk Oblast
World Wrestling Champions